Central Norfolk was a county constituency in the county of Norfolk.  It returned one Member of Parliament (MP)  to the House of Commons of the Parliament of the United Kingdom.

History

The constituency was created by the Representation of the People Act 1948 for the 1950 general election, and abolished for the February 1974 general election.

Boundaries 
1950–1955: The Rural Districts of Forehoe and Henstead, and St Faith's and Aylsham, and in the Rural District of Blofield and Flegg the parishes of Great and Little Plumstead, Postwick, and Thorpe next Norwich.

The Rural District of Forehoe and Henstead was previously part of South Norfolk, the former Rural District of Aylesham was part of North Norfolk, and areas to the north and east of Norwich (the former Rural District of St Faith's and the part of the Rural District of Blofield and Flegg) were part of the abolished constituency of East Norfolk.

1955–1974: As prior but with slightly redrawn boundaries.

On abolition, the Rural District of St Faiths and Aylsham was transferred to North Norfolk, the Rural District of Forhoe and Henstead to South Norfolk and the part of the Rural District of Blofield and Flegg to Yarmouth.  Small parts transferred to Norwich North and Norwich South due to expansion of the County Borough.

Members of Parliament

Elections

Elections in the 1950s

Elections in the 1960s 

anti-Common Market

Elections in the 1970s

References 

Parliamentary constituencies in Norfolk (historic)
Constituencies of the Parliament of the United Kingdom established in 1950
Constituencies of the Parliament of the United Kingdom disestablished in 1974